Steve Lehman (born 1978) is an American composer and saxophonist in the genres of jazz and experimental music. His compositions have been performed by a number of international performers and orchestras.

Early life and education 
Lehman was born in New York City. He earned a Bachelor of Arts and Master of Arts in composition from Wesleyan University and received his Doctor of Musical Arts with distinction in composition from Columbia University (under the direction of Tristan Murail, George E. Lewis, Fabien Lévy and Fred Lerdahl). He also attended classes with Jackie McLean for many years at the University of Hartford Hartt School.

Career 
As a performer, Lehman leads a number of his own ensembles and performs frequently as a sideman with artists like Anthony Braxton, Vijay Iyer, and Jason Moran. His recording Travail, Transformation & Flow (Pi Recordings 2009) was chosen as the #1 Jazz Album of the year by The New York Times. Lehman’s work has been reviewed in Artforum, Down Beat magazine, The New York Times, Newsweek, and The Wire, National Public Radio, and the BBC. Lehman was a Fulbright scholar from 2002-2003. Lehman is a professor of Music at the California Institute of the Arts in Valencia, California.

Awards and honors
 Jazz Album of the Year, New York Times, 2009, Travail, Transformation & Flow 
 Best New Album, NPR Music Jazz Critics Poll, 2014, Mise en Abime
 Guggenheim Fellowship 2015
 Doris Duke Artist Award 2014

Discography

As leader
 Structural Fire (CIMP, 2001)
  (CIMP, 2002)
 Interface (Clean Feed, 2004)
 Artificial Light (Fresh Sound, 2004)
 Demian as Posthuman (Pi, 2005)
 Manifold (Clean Feed, 2007)
 On Meaning (Pi, 2007)
 Travail, Transformation, and Flow (Pi, 2009)
 Dual Identity with Rudresh Mahanthappa (Clean Feed, 2010)
 Kaleidoscope & Collage with Stephan Crump (Intakt, 2011)
 Dialect Fluorescent (Pi, 2012)
 Mise en Abime (Pi, 2014)
 Steve Lehman & Sélébéyone (Pi, 2016)
 The People I Love with Craig Taborn (Pi, 2019)
 Xenakis and the Valedictorian (Pi, 2020)

As sideman 
With Anthony Braxton
 Nine Compositions (Hill) 2000 (CIMP, 2001)
 12+1tet (Victoriaville) 2007 (Victo, 2007)
 Sax Quintet (Middletown) 1998 Part I (New Braxton House, 2011)
 Sax Quintet (Middletown) 1998 Part II (New Braxton House, 2011)
 Tentet (Antwerp) 2000 Part I (New Braxton House, 2011)
 Tentet (Antwerp) 2000 Part II (New Braxton House, 2011)
 Tentet (Wesleyan) 2000 (Part I) (New Braxton House, 2011)
 Tentet (Wesleyan) 2000 (Part II) (New Braxton House, 2011)
 Tentet (Wesleyan) 1999 Part I (New Braxton House, 2012)
 Tentet (Wesleyan) 1999 Part II (New Braxton House, 2012)
 Alumni Orchestra (Wesleyan) 2005 (New Braxton House, 2012)
 Echo Echo Mirror House (NYC) 2011 (New Braxton House, 2012)
 Tentet (Paris) 2001 (New Braxton House, 2013)

With Liberty Ellman
 Ophiuchus Butterfly (Pi, 2006)
 Radiate (Pi, 2015)
 Last Desert (Pi, 2020)

With others
 Vijay Iyer, Far from Over  (ECM, 2017)
 Jason Moran, All Rise: A Joyful Elegy for Fats Waller (Blue Note, 2014)
 Kevin Norton, Change Dance Troubled Energy (Barking Hoop, 2001)
 Matthew Welch, Ceol Nua (Leo, 2002)

References

External links
 

1978 births
Musicians from New York City
American jazz composers
American male jazz composers
American jazz saxophonists
American male saxophonists
Wesleyan University alumni
Columbia University School of the Arts alumni
Living people
Jazz musicians from New York (state)
21st-century American saxophonists
21st-century American male musicians
Clean Feed Records artists
Pi Recordings artists